The Republic of Canada was a government proclaimed by William Lyon Mackenzie on December 5, 1837. The self-proclaimed government was established on Navy Island in the Niagara River in the latter days of the Upper Canada Rebellion.

History
In the latter days of the Rebellions of 1837 in Upper Canada, after Mackenzie and 200 of his followers retreated from Toronto to Navy Island, he declared a separate republic. He established an independent currency, and supplied his camp using the American supply steamer Caroline. He recruited followers by promising  of land to any man that supported his cause. He later included in his promise $100 in silver to his supporters, payable on May 1, 1838.

On December 29, Royal Navy Commander Andrew Drew and seven boatloads of Canadian militiamen crossed the Niagara River to Fort Schlosser. They captured the Caroline used by William Lyon Mackenzie and his rebels on Navy Island. Drew's forces set the ship alight and sent it adrift towards Niagara Falls, resulting in the death of one American. It was falsely reported that dozens of Americans were killed as they were trapped on board, and U.S. soldiers retaliated by burning a British steamer while it was in U.S. waters, triggering what became known as the Caroline affair.

On January 13, 1838, Mackenzie abandoned Navy Island under heavy fire from British troops. He and his force retreated to Buffalo, New York, where they were captured by the U.S. army and sentenced in the U.S. to 18 months' imprisonment for violating neutrality laws between the United States and the United Kingdom, ending the prospect of a Canadian declaration of independence/secession and ending what the British authorities described as an inconsequential and unsupported colonial rebellion.

Some of the supporters retreated to the Thousand Islands, and "caused Canadian authorities much anxiety" in mid-1838. In the United States, Hunters' Lodges were established along the frontier border, some also operating in Upper Canada. The organization of these societies was headquartered in Cleveland, and its principal mission was to "emancipate the British Colonies from British Thraldom". On 16 September 1838, a convention attended by 160 delegates of the organization was held in Cleveland, during which it elected Abram D. Smith the first president of the Republic of Canada. The organization also defined plans for a Republican Bank of Canada, which would use gold, silver, and its own currency as money, and pledged "the whole wealth, revenue, and resources" of Upper Canada as collateral for loans. Its first banknotes were to feature Samuel Lount, Peter Matthews, and James Morreau, all of whom were executed for their part in the rebellion.

See also
 Republicanism in Canada

Notes

References

External links
Flags of the World: Rebellion of 1837-1839 in Canada (Upper Canada)

Political history of Canada
Upper Canada Rebellion
Republicanism in Canada
States and territories established in 1837
1837 establishments in Upper Canada
1838 disestablishments in Upper Canada
Former republics